Domanick Williams (born October 1, 1980, as Domanick Davis) is a former American football running back. He played three years for the Houston Texans of the National Football League (NFL), after playing four seasons of college football at Louisiana State University (LSU).

Career

Note: during his active playing career, he was known as Domanick Davis.

Davis played college football for the LSU Tigers. In his four-year career there, he rushed for 2056 yards and 20 touchdowns, including four touchdowns in the 2002 Sugar Bowl.

Davis was drafted by Houston in the fourth round of the 2003 NFL Draft. He was named the 2003 Pepsi NFL Rookie of the Year, an award created in 2002, in which fans vote online from a pool of five candidates to determine the winner. He rushed for 1,000+ yards in his first two seasons in the NFL (2003 and 2004) while scoring 22 touchdowns.  As a result, he received a contract extension before the start of the 2005 season.  Prior to the extension, Davis was scheduled to make $385,000 in 2005.  The extension called for a payout of $22 million over the life of the deal, with $8 million in guaranteed money.

In 2005, Davis rushed for 976 yards in the first 11 games before suffering a knee injury and being placed on injured reserve. He did not play during the 2006 season, and was released by the Texans on March 22, 2007.

NFL career statistics

Personal life
He changed his surname from Davis to Williams in late 2006.

(on changing his name from Domanick Davis) “And it will be number 31, Domanick Williams. I just had to make a change. I wasn’t really a Davis the whole time, but I have kids of my own and I needed to do what was right.”

(more on the name change) “I just changed Davis to Williams. I wasn’t really a (Davis). It was my older brother’s Dad’s last name and whatever happened I ended up with Davis. So now that I have kids of my own, a little boy and a little girl, ‘Spike’ (Domanick, Jr.) and Lina, I have to change my name to what it really is, and it’s Williams.”

Source:

References

1980 births
Living people
Sportspeople from Lafayette, Louisiana
African-American players of American football
American football running backs
LSU Tigers football players
Houston Texans players
21st-century African-American sportspeople
20th-century African-American people